Emelina Adams (born 2 February 1992) is an American model and actress.

Early life
Adams’ hometown is Henderson, Nevada. Adams graduated with a Bachelor’s degree in psychology with a minor in pre-law from the University of Arizona. She lost her sister in 2016 to addiction and has campaigned against addiction in the years since. Adams is a second generation Italian and her father’s family come from Calabria, in southern Italy.

Career

Modelling
Adams began modelling at a young age and after being awarded one of the Tuscon12 spots at the University of Arizona she went on to win Miss Nevada USA 2016. Adams global modelling campaigns have included Marciano by GUESS.

Acting
Adams made her acting debut in 2019 in the Netflix series 13 Reasons Why. Adams appears as Angelina Young in the 2022 feature film Bullet Train alongside Brad Pitt amongst others, and the upcoming 2022 Wesley Snipes and Tiffany Haddish co-produced and co-starring film Back on the Strip. 

She is set to appear in Deadly Games, a crime-thriller filmed in Mexico from director Ojan Missaghi. Adams then has upcoming roles in Don’t Suck with Jamie Kennedy,  Mort In Sherman Oaks with Lucy Hale, American Murderer with Ryan Phillipe, and Michael Matteo Rossi’s The Sweepers.

Filmography

References

1992 births
Living people
American child models
21st-century American actresses
Female models from Nevada
American film actresses
Miss Nevada winners
American people of Italian descent